Calothamnus roseus is a plant in the myrtle family, Myrtaceae and is endemic to the south-west of Western Australia. It is a shrub with needle-shaped, prickly leaves and pink flowers with four stamen bundles. (In 2014 Craven, Edwards and Cowley proposed that the species be renamed Melaleuca rosea.)

Description

The flowers have 4 sepals and 4 petals. The flower cup (the hypanthium) and the sepals are hairy.

Taxonomy and naming
Calothamnus roseus was first formally described in 2010 by Alex George in Nuytsia from a specimen found near Ravensthorpe. The Latin roseus (rose-pink) refers to the colour of the stamens.

Distribution and habitat
Calothamnus roseus occurs near Ravensthorpe in the Esperance Plains biogeographic region, where it grows in rocky soil derived from quartzite.

Conservation
Calothamnus roseus is classified as "Priority One" by the Western Australian Government Department of Parks and Wildlife, meaning that it is known from only one or a few locations which are potentially at risk.

References

roseus
Myrtales of Australia
Plants described in 2010
Endemic flora of Western Australia